Collingwood College Boat Club (CCBC) is the rowing club of Collingwood College, part of Durham University. CCBC was formed in 1981 and is housed in the Collingwood College boathouse on the River Wear.

Collingwood is widely held as the most successful college rowing club at Durham University, with last year's (2021) highest ever placing at HORR of 101st, beating all Durham College crews, and two out of the four Durham University team boats. In the 2017/18 season they were the 3rd most successful university boat club in the country 

The club is led by an executive committee elected by the boat club members. The current president for 22/23 is Jon Foster, the Women's Captain 22/23 is Helen O'Connor, and the Men's Captain 22/23 is Ryan Cooper.

Racing 

CCBC competes in many races and regattas both in the North East and the rest of the United Kingdom, winning the college Victor Ludorum at Hexham Regatta 4 years in a row (2012-2016) and at Durham Regatta 3 years in a row (2018-2022). Below are some of the events CCBC has competed in over the last few years:

Henley Royal Regatta 

CCBC has raced at Henley Royal Regatta four times.

Henley Women's Regatta

Head of the River Races

CCBC regularly enters several crews into The Head of the River Race and Women's Head of the River Race. The highest placed finishes are recorded below.

See also
University rowing (UK)
Durham College Rowing

References

External links 
 Official website
 Collingwood College JCR

Durham University Rowing Clubs
Sports clubs established in 1981
1981 establishments in England